Fragments of an Anarchist Anthropology is one of a series of pamphlets published by Prickly Paradigm Press in 2004.  With the essay, anthropologist David Graeber attempts to outline areas of research that intellectuals might explore in creating a cohesive body of anarchist social theory.

Graeber posits that anthropology is "particularly well positioned" as an academic discipline that can look at the gamut of human societies and organizations, to study, analyze and catalog alternative social and economic structures around the world, and most importantly, present these alternatives to the world.

Revolution through non-confrontation 
One of the most striking suggestions in the pamphlet challenges the traditional anarchist notion of aggressive confrontation with the state. Graeber did postgraduate work with tribal cultures in Madagascar, including one with the Tsimihety in the northwest of the country. The Tsimihety, rejecting all governmental authority and organizing their society along very egalitarian lines, were able to continue their autonomy and culture for decades on end, up to the present, not by confronting the government, but by retreating. Graeber writes,
To this day they have maintained a reputation as masters of evasion: under the French, administrators would complain that they could send delegations to arrange for labor to build a
road near a Tsimihety village, negotiate the terms with apparently cooperative elders, and return with the equipment a week later only to discover the village entirely abandoned—every single inhabitant had moved in with some relative in another part of the country. (p. 55)

Aspects of an anarchist anthropology 
In particular, Graeber suggests several areas a hypothetical anarchist anthropology would need to tackle, and in the book elaborates on each point briefly:

A theory of the state
A theory of political entities that are not states
Yet another theory of capitalism
Power/ignorance, or power/stupidity (Graeber explores a possible theory of the relation of power not with knowledge, but with ignorance and stupidity, in explicit opposition to Foucault's theories of power and knowledge. "Because violence, particularly structural violence, where all the power is on one side, creates ignorance." (p. 72))
An ecology of voluntary associations
A theory of political happiness
Hierarchy
Suffering and pleasure: on the privatization of desire
One or several theories of alienation

Reasons for the nonexistence of anarchist anthropology 
Graeber offers several possibilities why anthropologists are reluctant to come out and make normative judgments and proposals: "In many ways, anthropology seems a discipline terrified of its own potential. It is, for example, the only discipline in a position to make generalizations about humanity as a whole—since it is the only discipline that actually takes all of humanity into account, and is familiar with all the anomalous cases." (p. 96) Anthropologists, Graeber writes, may be also simply afraid of being dismissed as "utopian."

Part of the problem, Graeber claims, is that traditionally, academics on the radical left have gravitated toward the more "High Theory"-oriented Marxism (Karl Marx himself was a PhD) rather than the more practice-oriented anarchism. Graeber further claims: "1. Marxism has tended to be a theoretical or analytical discourse about revolutionary strategy. 2. Anarchism has tended to be an ethical discourse about revolutionary practice" (p. 6).

See also
 Pierre Clastres
 Marcel Mauss
 Fieldwork Under Fire: Contemporary Studies of Violence and Survival
 Iraq at a Distance: What Anthropologists Can Teach Us about the War

References

Further reading 

 
 
 
 
 
 
 
 http://aotcpress.com/articles/anarchist-anthropology/

External links
Fragments of an Anarchist Anthropology available in PDF, EPUB, and Mobi formats via Libcom.org
Largely positive review of "Fragments" by Stevphen Shukaitis
Largely critical review of "Fragments" by Marxist cultural critic Steven Shaviro
Largely critical review of "Fragments" by Jason Adams
Prickly Paradigm Press

Books about anarchism
Books by David Graeber
Anthropology books
2004 non-fiction books
Pamphlets